Sylvain Komenan N'Guessan (born February 1, 1983 in Tiassalé) is an Ivorian professional footballer, who currently plays in the Championnat de France amateur 2 as a striker for Olympique Grande-Synthe.

Career
Komenan played on the professional level in Ligue 2 for LB Châteauroux.

Personal life
He also holds French citizenship.

Notes

1983 births
Living people
Ivorian footballers
Ligue 2 players
LB Châteauroux players
AS Moulins players
SO Romorantin players
USJA Carquefou players
Gazélec Ajaccio players
ESA Brive players
Montluçon Football players
FC Aurillac Arpajon Cantal Auvergne players
AFC Compiègne players
People from Lagunes District
Olympique Grande-Synthe players
Association football forwards